Hayley Miller (born 3 February 1996) is an Australian rules footballer playing for the Fremantle Football Club in the AFL Women's competition. Miller won the Fremantle fairest and best and leading goalkicker awards in 2022 and was named in the 2022 AFL Women's All-Australian team. She has served as Fremantle captain since the 2022 season, and is also Fremantle's games record holder with 60 games.

AFL Women's career
Miller was drafted by Fremantle with their first selection and fourth overall in the 2016 AFL Women's draft. She played every match in her debut season to finish with seven matches. Miller is a two-time winner of the WAWFL best and fairest award.

Miller was named as the new Fremantle captain in December 2021 taking over from inaugural captain Kara Antonio. A career best season saw Miller earn selection in the 2022 AFL Women's All-Australian team as a half forward, and named vice-captain.

Statistics
Updated to the end of S7 (2022).

|-
| 2017 ||  || 19
| 7 || 0 || 1 || 48 || 10 || 58 || 15 || 15 || 0.0 || 0.1 || 6.9 || 1.4 || 8.3 || 2.1 || 2.1 || 0
|-
| 2018 ||  || 19
| 7 || 1 || 1 || 66 || 24 || 90 || 14 || 26 || 0.1 || 0.1 || 9.4 || 3.4 || 12.9 || 2.0 || 3.7 || 4
|-
| 2019 ||  || 19
| 7 || 1 || 3 || 58 || 22 || 80 || 5 || 25 || 0.1 || 0.4 || 8.3 || 3.1 || 11.4 || 0.7 || 3.6 || 0
|-
| 2020 ||  || 19
| 7 || 1 || 2 || 71 || 26 || 97 || 20 || 29 || 0.1 || 0.3 || 10.1 || 3.7 || 13.9 || 2.9 || 4.1 || 2
|-
| 2021 ||  || 19
| 10 || 1 || 5 || 88 || 46 || 134 || 18 || 55 || 0.1 || 0.5 || 8.8 || 4.6 || 13.4 || 1.8 || 5.5 || 4
|-
| 2022 ||  || 19
| 12 || 10 || 9 || 174 || 50 || 224 || 39 || 73 || 0.8 || 0.8 || 14.5 || 4.2 || 18.7 || 3.3 || 6.1 || 15
|-
| S7 (2022) ||  || 19
| 10 || 3 || 4 || 130 || 43 || 173 || 18 || 45 || 0.3 || 0.4 || 13.0 || 4.3 || 17.3 || 1.8 || 4.5 || 5
|- class=sortbottom
! colspan=3 | Career
! 60 !! 17 !! 25 !! 635 !! 221 !! 856 !! 129 !! 268 !! 0.3 !! 0.4 !! 10.6 !! 3.7 !! 14.3 !! 2.2 !! 4.5 !! 30
|}

Honours and achievements
 Fremantle captain: 2022–present
 Fremantle games record holder
 AFL Women's All-Australian team: 2022
 Fremantle fairest and best: 2022
 Fremantle leading goalkicker: 2022
 Western Derby Medal: S7

References

External links

 
 
 

1996 births
Living people
Fremantle Football Club (AFLW) players
Australian rules footballers from Western Australia
Fremantle Football Club captains